The Sindhis in Afghanistan are part of Sindhi diaspora in South Asia.  Most Sindhis are indigenized in Afghanistan and live primarily in Kabul.

Modern day

History 

Many Sindhis came as merchants to Afghanistan during the period of the British Raj in Colonial India during the 19th-century, along with Punjabi Sikhs.  However many Sindhis left during the Soviet Invasion of Afghanistan. Many of these were Hindus or Sikhs who later converted to Islam.

Sindhis in Afghanistan are nowadays mostly working labour jobs in Kabul. During a visit to Kabul on 19 July 2009, Pakistani Interior Minister Rehman Malik said that President Karzai admitted that terrorist groups were training in Afghanistan. The Interior Minister of Afghanistan Haneef Atmar said that 400-500 Baloch and Sindhi separatists fled Pakistan to Afghanistan due to Pervez Musharraf's crackdown on separatist groups.

References 

Sindhi diaspora